is a Japanese manga series written by Takahito Oosaki and illustrated by Ikuro. It was serialized in Mag Garden's shōnen manga magazine Monthly Comic Garden, as well as the website Mag Comi, between February 2018 and March 2019 and was collected in two tankōbon volumes. The manga is licensed in North America by Seven Seas Entertainment. An original net animation adaptation by acca effe and Giga Production was streamed on the &CAST!!! and Production I.G's Anime Beans app between December 27, 2019, and January 17, 2020, for 12 episodes.

References

2019 anime ONAs
Comedy anime and manga
Japanese webcomics
Mag Garden manga
Seven Seas Entertainment titles
Shōnen manga
Sword and sorcery anime and manga
Webcomics in print